Palawan's 3rd congressional district is one of the three congressional districts of the Philippines in the province of Palawan. It has been represented in the House of Representatives since 2013. The district is composed of the city of Puerto Princesa and adjacent municipality of Aborlan. It was created after the 2012 reapportionment that redrew the boundaries of the 2nd district and allocated a new district for Palawan's capital and only city. It is currently represented in the 19th Congress by Edward Hagedorn of PDP-Laban.

Representation history

Election results

2019

2016

2013

See also
Legislative districts of Palawan

References

Congressional districts of the Philippines
Politics of Palawan
2012 establishments in the Philippines
Congressional districts of Mimaropa
Constituencies established in 2012